A polytechnic was a tertiary education teaching institution in England, Wales and Northern Ireland offering higher diplomas, undergraduate degree and post graduate education (masters and PhDs) that was governed and administered at the national level by the Council for National Academic Awards. At the outset, the focus of polytechnics was on STEM subjects with a special emphasis on engineering.  After the passage of the Further and Higher Education Act 1992 they became independent universities which meant they could award their own degrees. The comparable institutions in Scotland were collectively referred to as Central Institutions.

History

19th century 

The London Polytechnic (now the University of Westminster) emerged from the Royal Polytechnic Institution which was founded at Regent Street, London in 1838. The establishment of the polytechnic was a reaction to the rise of industrial power and technical education in France, Germany and the US. Degrees at the London Polytechnic were validated by the University of London.

1960s–1992 
Most polytechnics were formed in the expansion of higher education in the 1960s.Academic degrees in polytechnics were validated by the UK Council for National Academic Awards (CNAA) from 1965 to 1992. The division between universities and polytechnics was known as the binary divide in UK higher education. The CNAA was chartered by the British government to validate and award degrees, and maintain national quality assurance standards. The CNAA subject boards from their inception were from the universities; a CNAA degree was formally recognised as equivalent to a university degree, and the courses were under strict scrutiny by assessors external to the polytechnics. Sub-degree courses at these institutions were validated by the Business & Technology Education Council (BTEC).

Some polytechnics were often seen as ranking below universities in the provision of higher education, because they lacked degree-awarding powers, concentrated on applied science and engineering education, produced less research than the universities, and because the qualifications necessary to gain a place in one were sometimes lower than for a university (the failure rate in the first year of undergraduate courses was high, due to a rigorous filtering process). However, in terms of an undergraduate education, this was a misconception, since many polytechnics offered academic degrees validated by the CNAA, from bachelor's and master's degrees to PhD research degrees. In addition, professional degrees in subjects such as engineering, town planning, law, and architecture were rigorously validated by various professional institutions. Many polytechnics argued that a CNAA degree was superior to many university degrees, especially in engineering, due to the external independent validation process employed by the CNAA, the oversight of the engineering institutions, and innovations such as sandwich degrees. Such innovations made a polytechnic education more relevant for professional work in applying science and advanced technology in industry.

Post-1992
Under the Further and Higher Education Act 1992 they became fully fledged universities. After 1992, the former polytechnics ("new universities") awarded their own degrees.

List of former polytechnics

In England, there are:
Anglia Ruskin University, formerly Anglia Polytechnic (located in Cambridge and Chelmsford)
Birmingham City University, formerly Birmingham Polytechnic
University of Brighton, formerly Brighton Polytechnic
Bournemouth University, formerly Bournemouth Polytechnic
University of Central Lancashire, formerly Lancashire Polytechnic and before that Preston Polytechnic (until 1984)
Coventry University, formerly Coventry Polytechnic and Lanchester Polytechnic (until 1987)
De Montfort University Leicester, formerly Leicester Polytechnic
University of East London, formerly North East London Polytechnic and Polytechnic of East London
University of Greenwich, formerly Woolwich Polytechnic (until 1970), then Thames Polytechnic
University of Hertfordshire, formerly Hatfield Polytechnic
University of Huddersfield, formerly Huddersfield Polytechnic
Kingston University, formerly Kingston Polytechnic
Leeds Beckett University, formerly Leeds Polytechnic and as Leeds Metropolitan University from 1998 to 2013
Lincoln University was formed in part from Humberside Polytechnic which was briefly Humberside University
Liverpool John Moores University, formerly Liverpool Polytechnic
London Metropolitan University, formerly City of London Polytechnic and Polytechnic of North London
Manchester Metropolitan University, formerly Manchester Polytechnic
Middlesex University, formerly Middlesex Polytechnic
University of Northumbria at Newcastle, formerly Newcastle Polytechnic
Nottingham Trent University, formerly Trent Polytechnic (later Nottingham Polytechnic)
Oxford Brookes University, formerly Oxford Polytechnic
University of Plymouth, Plymouth Polytechnic (until 1989), then Polytechnic South West
University of Portsmouth, formerly Portsmouth Polytechnic
Sheffield Hallam University, formerly Sheffield Polytechnic
South Bank University, formerly South Bank Polytechnic (in London)
Staffordshire University, formerly Staffordshire Polytechnic and previously North Staffordshire Polytechnic
University of Sunderland, formerly Sunderland Polytechnic
Teesside University, formerly Teesside Polytechnic
University of the West of England, formerly Bristol Polytechnic
University of West London, formerly Polytechnic of West London
University of Westminster, formerly Polytechnic of Central London and the Royal Polytechnic Institution – Regent Street
University of Wolverhampton, formerly Wolverhampton Polytechnic

In addition, Wales has
University of South Wales, formerly Polytechnic of Wales and University of Glamorgan

and Northern Ireland has:
New University of Ulster which was a plate glass university. It absorbed the former Ulster Polytechnic, afterwards it was known as the University of Ulster. It is now known as Ulster University

In Scotland there were comparable Higher Education institutions called Central Institutions but these very rarely used the designation "Polytechnic" in their titles; these also converted into universities.
 One institution that did briefly use the designation "Polytechnic" was Edinburgh Napier University. Between 1988 and 1992 the institution was known as Napier Polytechnic.

See also 

 College of advanced technology (United Kingdom)
Universities in the United Kingdom
Education in Finland § Tertiary education, a similar divide in Finland

References

1969 in education
1969 in the United Kingdom
Business education in the United Kingdom
Higher education in the United Kingdom